Moni or Mone (Kamkata-vari: Mone/Mune), also known as Mandi (from Prasun) was, after Imra, the second-most important god in the pre-Islamic pantheon of the Nuristani people. With his breath, Imra created Moni and Gish. Moni was believed to be a divine prophet, whom Imra selected to fulfill his behests. Nearly every village had a temple devoted to Moni.

Etymology
The name of the deity is said to have been derived from a borrowing of Sanskrit Mahādeva, a title ascribed to the god Shiva, who is similar to Moni in most aspects, such as the bow, bull, and destroyer of the cattle of demons.

See also
Ōanamuji
Shiva

References 

Asian gods
Indo-European deities
Oracular gods